is a passenger railway station on the Tōhoku Main Line located in Minuma-ku, Saitama, Japan, operated by East Japan Railway Company (JR East).

Lines 

Station layout
This station has an elevated station building, with a single ground-level island platform serving two tracks. The station is staffed.

Platforms

History 
The station opened on March 20, 1964. With the privatization of JNR on 1 April 1987, the station came under the control of JR East.

Passenger statistics
In fiscal 2019, the station was used by an average of 33,531 passengers daily (boarding passengers only).

See also
List of railway stations in Japan

References

External links

 Higashi-Omiya Station  

Railway stations in Japan opened in 1964
Stations of East Japan Railway Company
Railway stations in Saitama (city)
Tōhoku Main Line
Utsunomiya Line